Courser may refer to:

 Courser – group of birds which together with the pratincoles make up the family Glareolidae
 Courser (horse) – a swift and strong horse, frequently used during the Middle Ages for hunting or as a warhorse
 Horse courser – early term for a horse dealer

Or to someone who engages in:
Coursing – the pursuit of game or other animals by dogs
Hare coursing – the hunting of hares with dogs
Lure coursing – a sport for dogs that involves chasing a mechanically operated lure

Or to persons named Courser:
Todd Courser,- Michigan state representative

Transportation:
Chrysler 26 Courser, an American sailboat design